Milsbeek is a village in the Dutch province of Limburg. It is a part of the municipality of Gennep, and lies about 14 km southeast of Nijmegen.

The village was first mentioned in 1329 as Milsbeec, and is named after a brook.

Milsbeek was home to 520 people in 1840. The former pottery was turned into a pottery museum in 2016, and has to last remaining wood oven of the Netherlands.

Gallery

References

Populated places in Limburg (Netherlands)
Gennep